Ruth Hamilton (née Jensen) (April 21, 1898 – January 18, 2008) was an American politician and centenarian. Hamilton served in the New Hampshire House of Representatives from  1964 to 1973, and she was one of the first woman talk radio show hosts in the country.

Biography
Hamilton was born in Alta, Iowa, to Peter and Hulda Jensen on April 21, 1898. At a Fourth of July sandlot baseball game in 1920, she met Carter Hamilton. After he was drafted to play professional baseball for the Cleveland Indians, the two got married a year later. Together they had an adopted son named Peter. Carter Hamilton died in 1949, and Ruth would remain a lifelong widow ever since. She died aged 109, on January 18, 2008, in Orlando, Florida

Political career
First being elected in 1964, Hamilton was the first woman elected to the New Hampshire state legislature; a position she remained in until 1973. She was instrumental in passing laws that shut down orphanages and made littering a crime in that state.

She was one of America's first female radio talk-show hosts.

Hamilton was a world traveler well into her 90s and lectured all across the country. She became a member of Growing Bolder, a social networking service, while living in a Florida assisted living community.

References

External links 
 Archives of the Ruth Hamilton collection at the University of Iowa

1898 births
2008 deaths
American centenarians
Members of the New Hampshire General Court
Women state legislators in New Hampshire
American women bloggers
American bloggers
People from Orlando, Florida
People from Buena Vista County, Iowa
Women centenarians
20th-century American women
21st-century American women